William Linn may refer to:

 William Linn (clergyman) (1752–1808), President of Queen's College (now Rutgers University) and Chaplain of the United States House of Representatives
 William Linn (soldier) (died 1836?), believed to have fought and died in the Battle of the Alamo
 William Alexander Linn (1846–1917), American journalist and historian

See also
William Lynn (disambiguation)